The Mohegan Tribe is a federally recognized tribe and sovereign tribal nation of the Mohegan people. Their reservation is the Mohegan Indian Reservation, located on the Thames River in Uncasville, Connecticut.

Mohegan's independence as a sovereign nation has been documented by treaties and laws for over 350 years, such as the Treaty of Hartford secured by their Sachem (Chief) Uncas after his cooperation and victory with the English in the Pequot War (1637–1638). Although the Treaty of Hartford established English recognition of the tribe's sovereignty in 1638, after the colonial period and loss of lands, the tribe struggled to maintain recognition of its identity.

The tribe reorganized in the late 20th century and filed a federal land claims suit, seeking to regain land that the state of Connecticut had illegally sold. As part of the settlement, the Mohegan Nation gained federal recognition by the United States government in 1994. That year the US Congress passed the Mohegan Nation (Connecticut) Land Claim Settlement Act. The US authorized the cleaned-up United Nuclear site for use as Mohegan reservation lands, and the property was transferred to the United States in trust for the tribe.

Gaining a sovereign reservation enabled the Mohegan to establish gaming operations on their lands to generate revenue for welfare and economic development of their tribe. They opened the Mohegan Sun casino on October 12, 1996, near the former Fort Shantok site above the Thames River.

Mohegan Tribe's vision 
In 1997 the Mohegan Tribe's Council of Elders adopted the following Vision Statement:

We are the Wolf People, children of Mundo, a part of the Tree of Life. Our ancestors
form our roots, our living Tribe is the trunk, our grandchildren are the buds of our future.
We remember and teach the stories of our ancestors.
We watch. We listen. We learn.
We respect Mother Earth, our Elders, and all that comes from Mundo.
We are willing to break arrows of peace to heal old and new wounds. We acknowledge and learn
from our mistakes.
We walk as a single spirit on the Trail of Life. We are guided by thirteen generations
past and responsible to thirteen generations to come.
We survive as a nation guided by the wisdom of our past. Our circular trail returns
us to wholeness as a people.

History 
Before the seventeenth century, the Mohegan were part of the Pequot Tribe, which emerged among Algonquian peoples located in present south central New England.

Uncas 

The early 1600s were a critical period of change for Connecticut tribes. The pressure from rapidly expanding European settlements created competition for land and resources, while new infectious diseases were decimating Indian populations. Within the Pequot Tribe at that time, a dispute erupted between the Pequot Sachem Sassacus and the leader Uncas.

Uncas left with his followers, who called themselves the Mohegan, or Wolf People, like their ancestors. Each tribe had its own idea of how to deal with conflicts with the English and other Europeans. Uncas (1598–1683) became Sachem of the Mohegan Tribe, which favored collaboration with the English colonists. The Pequot under Sassacus chose to fight the colonists, and other local tribes took sides in the Pequot War, which lasted from 1637–1638.

Seeing the great losses brought on by continued fighting, Uncas had befriended the European invaders. This controversial decision brought Uncas and the Mohegan people into an uneasy alliance with the English in the ensuing war with the Pequot (1637–1638). The Mohegan helped the English defeat the Pequot.

Uncas settled his people in a village at Shantok on the Thames River, which the Tribe defended from a Narragansett invasion. It was sparked by related European as well as Indian conflicts. Finally, the Mohegan Tribe's alliance with the English kept its people relatively safe during the colonists attacks on Native Americans during King Philip's War and afterward.

Government 
The Mohegan Tribe has created and maintained an independent governmental structure since before Europeans arrived in North America. The Mohegan Government has evolved to exercise full civil and criminal jurisdiction over their lands using the Constitution of the Mohegan Tribe of Indians of Connecticut, which they wrote in the 20th century.

The Mohegan Nation is governed by the Mohegan people. They elect a Tribal Council of nine Tribal Members and a Council of Elders, composed of seven Tribal Members. All legislative and executive powers of the Tribe not granted to the Council of Elders are vested with the Tribal Council. Marilynn Malerba was named the 18th lifetime chief of the Mohegan Tribe on August 15, 2010, and is the first female chief in modern history to hold this position.

The Council of Elders oversees judicial matters and the tribe's cultural integrity. The Council of Elders also exercises legislative powers with respect to rules governing tribal membership and enrollment. The Tribal Court adjudicates on all non-gaming matters.

Following Congressional passage of the 1988 Indian Gaming Regulatory Act, the Mohegan Nation used its cooperative relationship with the State of Connecticut to negotiate a gaming compact, after it had gained federal recognition in 1994 and receiving land in settlement under the Mohegan Nation (Connecticut) Land Claim Settlement Act (1994). The US took into trust the cleaned-up United Nuclear site for use by the Mohegan as a sovereign reservation.

The Tribe opened the Mohegan Sun casino in 1996, two years after gaining federal recognition. The compact created between Connecticut and the Mohegan Tribe secured 25 percent of slot revenues to the state to help fund services. It became a model agreement. Connecticut's Native American tribes have generated the highest revenues  for the state aside from federal government installations. The government-to-government relationships that have developed between Connecticut and Mohegan have enabled quick resolutions to issues that have been raised, such as: regulation of indoor smoking, alcohol service, and state police presence at the reservation.

Community contributions 
The Mohegan Tribe used its own funds to pay for the $35 million access road that enables visitors to reach Mohegan Sun without tying up Montville roads. The tribe has worked closely with its neighbors and provided the funding for an $11 million regional water project in order to ensure safe, clean drinking water.

The tribe has been a strong advocate in the effort to ensure that Connecticut's communities get a greater share of slots revenues. It proposed a successful initiative to modify the funding formula so that communities most affected by the casinos receive additional funds from the Pequot-Mohegan Fund.

In addition, the Mohegan Tribe pays $500,000 each year to the Town of Montville in lieu of taxes. The Mohegan Tribe is a partner in the Community Economic Development Fund. The revolving loan program will help regional small businesses create jobs. The tribe is the first and only non-bank investor in such a program in Connecticut.

A member of the Mohegan Tribe sits on the board of trustees for the University of Connecticut.

Economy 
The Mohegan Tribe has used gaming to generate revenue for economic development of the Tribe, its members, and the surrounding communities. Mohegan Sun employs about 10,000 individuals internally, while buying supplies and services from hundreds of small and medium-sized vendors and local companies that also employ thousands of individuals. Employees of the Tribes and Casinos pay all federal and state income taxes as well as other employment taxes, providing tens of millions of dollars to the state and federal governments.

As mandated by federal law and the Mohegan Tribe's Constitution and laws, profits from Native American gaming go to support the health, education, welfare, and infrastructure of tribal governments. Although tribes are entitled to certain federal grants, by 1997 the Mohegan Tribe was in a position to return or reject funds. That year, it turned back $2.2 million in grant funds to the Department of Housing and Urban Development (HUD) to be redistributed to other Native American nations.

Since its opening in October 1996, the Mohegan Sun has generated substantial revenues for Connecticut's economy:
Approximately $2.5 billion in slot revenue contributions to the State of Connecticut
Over $4 billion is salaries, wages and benefits for employees
Over $6 billion in goods and services
Over $200 million in state taxes
Over $65 million in state services
Over $18 million in charitable donations

The tribe is a part owner of the New England Black Wolves National Lacrosse League franchise, and full owner of the WNBA's Connecticut Sun. It is the first Native American tribe to own a professional sports franchise. A tribe-affiliated company also owns Resorts Casino Hotel in Atlantic City, New Jersey.

In September 2019, a deal was announced for Mohegan Gaming and Entertainment, an affiliate of the Mohegan Tribe, to operate the casino at the new Virgin Hotels Las Vegas on the site of the former Hard Rock Hotel and Casino (Las Vegas). It is the first Native American tribe to operate a Las Vegas casino.

Notable Mohegan 
Emma Baker, revived the Green Corn Ceremony and served as tribal chairperson
Fidelia Hoscott Fielding (1827–1908), last native speaker of the Mohegan-Pequot language
John E. Hamilton (1897–1988), Grand Sachem Chief Rolling Cloud, Indian rights activist
Samson Occom (1723–1792), Presbyterian minister who helped move the Brothertown Indians to New York state
Gladys Tantaquidgeon (1899–2005), anthropologist, herbalist, co-founder of the Tantaquidgeon Museum
Harold Tantaquidgeon (1904-1989), sailor, airman, soldier, scout and co-founder of the Tantaquidgeon Museum
Uncas (c. 1588 – c. 1683), first sachem of the Mohegan
Mahomet Weyonomon, a sachem who traveled to England in 1735 to seek better and fair treatment of his people
Marilynn Malerba, the first Native American to be appointed as Treasurer of the United States

See also 

 Mohegan people
 Mahican – tribe with similar name
 The Last of the Mohicans, historical fiction of a tribe with similar name

Notes

External links 
The Mohegan Tribe, official website
Mohegan Nation (Connecticut) Land Claims Settlement, Pub. L. No. 103-377, 108 Stat. 3501 (codified at )

Native American tribes in Connecticut
American Indian reservations in Connecticut
Federally recognized tribes in the United States
Algonquian peoples
Mohegan